Queen Elizabeth Grammar School Carmarthen was a selective secondary school in Carmarthen, Carmarthenshire. It closed in 1978.

Former students
Among the school's former pupils were the educationalist Griffith Jones; the early Methodist leader and Bible publisher Peter Williams; the senior Admiralty civil servant Sir Walter St David Jenkins; the clergyman James Rice Buckley; the Welsh poet William Saunders; the Welsh international rugby players, Roy Bergiers, Gerald Davies and Ray Gravell;, the tennis commentator and journalist Gerald Williams. and the journalist and author Byron Rogers.

Old boys who have excelled in the political sphere include Denzil Davies and Mark Drakeford, who was appointed First Minister of Wales in 2018.

References

Defunct schools in Wales
Grammar schools in Wales
Buildings and structures in Carmarthen